RDN may refer to:

 Radian Group (NYSE stock symbol), an American mortgage insurance company
 Radiodialnet (RDN.pe), communications and psychology department radio station for the University of San Martín de Porres
 Redang Airport (IATA airport code), Malaysia
 Reddish North railway station (National Rail station code), England
 Regional District of Nanaimo, on Vancouver Island, British Columbia, Canada
 Registered Dental Nurse
 Registered Dietitian Nutritionist, a qualified dietician 
 Relative Distinguished Name, an identifier type in the LDAP internet protocol
 Robert De Niro
 Royal Danish Navy

See also 
 Reverse domain name notation